Generation Progress is a youth-centered research and advocacy group that promotes progressive political and social policy through support for young people, students, and activists in the United States. Generation Progress is the youth engagement arm of the Center for American Progress.

Launched in 2005 as Campus Progress, in 2013 the organization was renamed Generation Progress to reflect the group's work to reach beyond college campuses and involve older, working-class, and non-college-bound young people, in progressive activism. Their main issue areas cover gun violence prevention, criminal justice reform, progressive economics, student debt, immigration, and climate change.

Generation Progress has a sister organization, Generation Progress Action, that engages in political and electoral advocacy activities.

History
From the organization's founding in 2005 until 2012, Generation Progress was led by David Halperin, former White House speechwriter to President Bill Clinton. Halperin was succeeded by Anne Johnson, and then Maggie Thompson, who formerly led the Higher Ed, Not Debt campaign. The current executive director of Generation Progress is Brent J. Cohen. As of 2021, Edwith Theogene is the current director of advocacy at Generation Progress.

Activities 

Generation Progress has programs and networks across issue areas. The organization lobbies Congress and state governments, produces media content, and conducts trainings. Generation Progress has worked with Senator Elizabeth Warren in an attempt to curb rising student debt through a proposal which would lower interest rates and increase taxes.

The organization held it first annual national conference in Washington D.C. in July 2005. The event featured President Bill Clinton and Rep. John Lewis. Subsequent national conferences have featured Barack Obama, Tammy Baldwin, Samantha Power, Majora Carter, James A. Forbes, Nancy Pelosi, Russ Feingold, Keith Ellison, Tom Daschle, Ralph Nader, Seymour Hersh, and Fat Joe. The organization's events have been co-sponsored by Rock the Vote and the League of Women Voters.

See also
Generation Opportunity

References

External links
 Generation Progress
 Generation Progress on OpenSecrets.org

Political and economic think tanks in the United States
American political blogs
Center for American Progress
Progressive organizations in the United States
Organizations established in 2005
2005 establishments in the United States
Student political organizations in the United States